Haplocochlias cubensis is a species of sea snail, a marine gastropod mollusk in the family Skeneidae.

Description
The height of the shell attains 3 mm.

Distribution
This marine species is found in the Caribbean Sea off Cuba at depths between 30 m and 40 m.

References

 Espinosa, J., J. Ortea, R. Fernández-Garcés and L. Moro. 2007. Adiciones a la fauna de moluscos marinos de la península de Guanahacabibes (I), con la descripción de nuevas especies. Avicennia 19: 63–88.

External links

cubensis
Gastropods described in 2007